Charles Edgar "Chuck" Fipke  (born 1946) is a Canadian geologist and prospector who discovered the existence of diamonds around Lac de Gras in Canada's Northwest Territories. He is now a multimillionaire involved in geological explorations around the world. Fipke is also a prominent owner and breeder in North American thoroughbred horse racing.

Background

Fipke was born in Edmonton, Alberta. Growing up, he was sometimes assumed to be stupid because of his "frantic stop-start mind". His nicknames include Captain Chaos and Stumpy. He occasionally stammers and is known for his use of the word "hey" at the end of sentences.

In 1970, he graduated from University of British Columbia (UBC) with a bachelor of science degree in geology. Fipke received an honorary doctorate from Okanagan University College in 1998.

In 2006, Fipke donated  to UBC to support the creation of the Charles Fipke Centre for Innovative Research. In 2012, the Fipke Laboratory for Trace Element Research (FiLTER) opened, with Fipke funding the purchase of imaging equipment including a scanning electron microscope. "To graduate excellent scientists, a university needs to have the best technology available," said Fipke. "My goal is to help UBC's Okanagan campus reach the leading edges of science, in order to recruit the top students and faculty from around the world." Fipke has also donated substantially to Alzheimer's research at UBC.

Fipke was divorced by his wife Marlene (née Pyett) in 2000, who had been with him since he began searching for the diamonds.

Career 
Upon graduation, Fipke worked for companies such as Kennecott Copper and Cominco, performing mineral explorations in locations such as Papua New Guinea, South Africa and Brazil. He became an expert in the study of indicator minerals to identify potential strikes, the key to his later success. "Everyone now knows that G-10 garnets with low calcium might lead you to diamonds, hey," he said in 2011. "But how do you distinguish between a group 1 eclogitic garnet that grew with a diamond and a group 2 eclogitic garnet that didn't? They look the same." Fipke uses custom software to help determine the difference. "No one else out there can distinguish between these similar tiny particles of minerals that grow with a diamond and ones that don't."

In 1977, Fipke founded CF Mineral Research, a heavy mineral and diamond exploration research laboratory. In 1983, he founded Dia Met Minerals, which became listed on the Vancouver Stock Exchange in 1984. Dia Met was sold to BHP Billiton in 2001.

In 1988, Fipke and partner Stu Blusson began a systematic search for diamonds in the Northwest Territories, leading to the discovery of the first diamond pipe in North America in November 1991 near Lac de Gras. The Ekati Diamond Mine is now located there. "I'm not really a miner," he said. "I'm an exploration geologist. This sale gives me more ability to do exploration."

Fipke is currently involved in multiple greenfield projects, involving searches for diamonds in Ontario with Metalex Ventures, for gold in the Yukon, Nevada and Yemen with Cantex Mine Development and for uranium along the Manitoba–Saskatchewan border with Northern Uranium.

Horse racing 
Fipke bought his first thoroughbred racehorse in 1981 and has subsequently become a significant owner and breeder. His major winners include:
 Forever Unbridled, winner of the 2017 Breeders' Cup Distaff, multiple graded-stakes winner and daughter of Lemons Forever
 Perfect Soul, winner of the 2003 Shadwell Turf Mile
 Tale of Ekati, named for his diamond mine, winner of the Grade I Wood Memorial and Cigar Mile in 2008
 Not Bourbon, winner of the 2008 Queen's Plate
 Seeking the Soul, winner of the 2017 Clark Handicap and track record setter for  miles at Keeneland
 Lemons Forever, winner of the 2006 Kentucky Oaks at odds of 47–1
 Unbridled Forever, winner of the 2015 Ballerina Stakes and full sister to Forever Unbridled 
 Perfect Shirl, winner of the 2011 Breeders' Cup Filly and Mare Turf
 Jersey Town, winner of the 2012 Cigar Mile
 Java's War, winner of the 2013 Blue Grass Stakes
 Internallyflawless, winner of the 2009 Del Mar Oaks
 Golden Soul, a longshot in the 2013 Kentucky Derby, who finished second and had a payout more than three times higher than the winner Orb (38.60 to place vs. 12.80 to win)
 Tale of Verve, second to American Pharoah in the 2015 Preakness Stakes at odds of 28–1

Fipke owns two farms in Kentucky where he houses roughly 75 broodmares. He breeds mainly to stallions Tale of Ekati, Perfect Soul and Jersey Town.

Honours and awards

Fipke has received multiple honors, including:
 The Northern Miner'''s Mining Man of the Year (1992)
 PDAC's Prospector of the Year (1992)
 H.H. "Spud" Huestis Award for prospecting and mineral exploration (1997)
 Daniel C. Jackling Award for contributions to technical progress in mining, geology, and geophysics (2004)
 Robert M. Dreyer Award for outstanding achievement in applied economic geology (2005)

He was inducted into the Canadian Mining Hall of Fame in 2013.

Fipke's history forms a significant portion of the "narrative broth" from which author Kathy Reichs formed the plot of the novel Bones Are Forever.

References

Further reading
Kevin Krajick, Barren Lands: An Epic Search for Diamonds in the North American Arctic.  2001, Freeman/Henry Holt, .  at Smithsonian Magazine
Kathy Reichs, Bones are Forever''  2012, Scribner,  .

External links
 Tribute Video produced by the Canadian Mining Hall of Fame

Living people
Canadian geologists
University of British Columbia alumni
Canadian philanthropists
1946 births
Canadian prospectors
Canadian racehorse owners and breeders
Members of the Order of Canada
Scientists from Edmonton
Owners of King's Plate winners